Kenneth Lee Beck (September 3, 1935 – March 5, 2006), was a defensive tackle in the National Football League. Beck played two seasons with the Green Bay Packers. He was a member of the Western Division Champion Packers in 1960. Beck was chosen by the Minnesota Vikings in the 1961 Expansion Draft, but was released by team at the end of training camp. He played for the Canadian Football League Toronto Argos from 1961 to 1962 under Coach Lou Agassi. Beck was one of only two men to have played for both Bear Bryant and Vince Lombardi.

References

1935 births
2006 deaths
Sportspeople from Minden, Louisiana
Green Bay Packers players
American football defensive tackles
Texas A&M Aggies football players
Players of American football from Louisiana
High school football coaches in Louisiana
Minden High School (Minden, Louisiana) alumni
Staunton Military Academy alumni
Southern Arkansas University alumni
Educators from Louisiana
American Pentecostals
Deaths from cancer in Louisiana
People from Cotton Valley, Louisiana
Educators from Texas